A list of films produced in Argentina in 1987:

External links and references
 Argentine films of 1987 at the Internet Movie Database

1987
Argentine
Films